Jasmine Paolini was the defending champion, but chose not to participate.

Jule Niemeier won the title, defeating Elisabetta Cocciaretto in the final, 7–5, 6–1.

Seeds

Draw

Finals

Top half

Bottom half

Qualifying

Seeds

Qualifiers

Qualifying draw

First qualifier

Second qualifier

Third qualifier

Fourth qualifier

References

External links
Main Draw
Qualifying Draw

2022 WTA 125 tournaments